Bembidion sulcipenne is a species of ground beetle in the family Carabidae. It is found in Europe and Northern Asia (excluding China) and North America.

Subspecies
These three subspecies belong to the species Bembidion sulcipenne:
 Bembidion sulcipenne hyperboroides Lindroth, 1963
 Bembidion sulcipenne prasinoides Lindroth, 1963
 Bembidion sulcipenne sulcipenne J. Sahlberg, 1880

References

Further reading

 

sulcipenne
Articles created by Qbugbot
Beetles described in 1880